Gramdihi is a village in Bhatar CD block in Bardhaman Sadar North subdivision of Purba Bardhaman district in the state of West Bengal, India with total 544 families residing.

History
Census 2011 Gramdihi Village Location Code or Village Code 319773. The village of Gramdihi is located in the Bhatar tehsil of Burdwan district in West Bengal, India.

Transport 

Population 
Gramdihi village of Barddhaman has substantial population of Schedule Caste. Schedule Caste (SC) constitutes 28.00% while Schedule Tribe (ST) were 7.78% of total population in Gramdihi  village.

Population and house data

Healthcare
Nearest Rural Hospital at Bhatar (with 60 beds) is the main medical facility in Bhatar CD block. There are primary health centers..

School
GRAMDIHI JR. BASIC SCHOOL.

References 

Villages in Purba Bardhaman district
West Bengal articles missing geocoordinate data